Ellwood F.C. is a football club based in Ellwood, Gloucestershire, England. They played in the FA Vase during the 1980s.

History
The club was formed in 1907. The club played in local leagues, such as the Forest of Dean Football league until the 1984–85 season when they joined the Gloucestershire County Football League. The 1989–90 season saw the club win the league, a season after entering the FA Vase for the first time.  

The club stayed in the Gloucestershire County League until the end of the 2015–16 season, when the club decided to withdraw from the league due to a failure to attract players and Coaches suitable for County level football. The club moved to the North Gloucestershire Association Football League, winning the Premier Division in the 2017–18 season, winning promotion to the Gloucestershire Northern Senior League. The club did not even last a season in the Northern Senior league, pulling out in September. The club for the 2019–20 season rejoined the North Gloucestershire League in Division one.

Ground
The club play their home games at the Bromley Road ground.

Honours

Gloucestershire County Football League
Champions (1) 1989–90
North Gloucestershire Association Football League
Champions (1) 2017–18

References

External links

Football clubs in England
Gloucestershire County Football League
1907 establishments in England
Association football clubs established in 1907